The Sembawang Air Base  is a military airbase of the Republic of Singapore Air Force (RSAF) located at Sembawang, in the northern part of Singapore. The base motto is Swift and Resolute.

History

RAF Sembawang
Before Singapore's independence from the United Kingdom, it was a Royal Air Force station known as RAF Sembawang as well as being the Royal Naval Air Station – HMS Simbang – to the carrier pilots of the Royal Navy Fleet Air Arm (attached to the Eastern Fleet based in Singapore) who used it for rest and refit whenever an aircraft carrier of the Royal Navy berthed at the nearby HMNB Singapore for refuel and repairs, which also housed the largest Royal Navy dockyard east of Suez up to the time of UK forces withdrawal from Singapore.

After the Japanese capture of Singapore during World War II, the Imperial Japanese Navy Air Service took over the two RAF stations of Sembawang and Seletar. Singapore was split into north–south spheres of control, and the Imperial Japanese Army Air Force took over RAF Tengah. It was not until September 1945 that the two airfields reverted to British control following the Japanese surrender.

RAF Sembawang was a key part of Britain's continued military presence in the Far East (along with the three other RAF bases in Singapore: RAF Changi, RAF Seletar, RAF Tengah) during the critical period of the Malayan Emergency (1948–1960), the Brunei Revolt in 1962 and the Indonesia–Malaysia confrontation (1962–1966).

Units
1941–42
 No. 62 Squadron RAF (detachment) – Bristol Blenheim I.
 No. 21 Squadron, Royal Australian Air Force (RAAF) – Brewster Buffalo
 No. 453 Squadron RAAF – Brewster Buffalo I.

1945–1971
Royal Air Force
 No. 28 Squadron RAF – Supermarine Spitfire FR.18.
 No. 60 Squadron RAF – Spitfire F.18.
 No. 194 Squadron RAF reformed here during February 1953 from the Far East Casevac Flight – Westland Dragonfly HC.2.
 No. 656 Squadron RAF reformed here on 29 June 1948 from No. 1914 Flight RAF – Auster AOP.5.

Royal Navy
 Aircraft Holding Unit Sembawang.
 Naval Aircraft Support Unit Sembawang.
 791 Naval Air Squadron
 800 Naval Air Squadron
 802 Naval Air Squadron
 804 Naval Air Squadron
 806 Naval Air Squadron
 807 Naval Air Squadron
 811 Naval Air Squadron
 812 Naval Air Squadron
 814 Naval Air Squadron
 815 Naval Air Squadron
 816 Naval Air Squadron
 817 Naval Air Squadron
 820 Naval Air Squadron
 824 Naval Air Squadron
 825 Naval Air Squadron
 826 Naval Air Squadron
 827 Naval Air Squadron
 837 Naval Air Squadron
 845 Naval Air Squadron
 846 Naval Air Squadron
 847 Naval Air Squadron
 848 Naval Air Squadron
 849A Naval Air Squadron
 888 Naval Air Squadron
 1700 Naval Air Squadron
 3 Commando Brigade Air Squadron

Sembawang Air Base
The base was renamed Sembawang Air Base (SBAB) in 1971 when it was handed over to the Singapore Air Defence Command (SADC). From 1971 to 1976, under the auspices of the Five Power Defence Arrangements (FPDA), Sembawang housed British, Australian and New Zealand forces.

In 1983, the airbase became a full-fledged rotary-wing air base when the first resident helicopter squadron – 120 Squadron – was permanently relocated from Changi Air Base.

In the late 1990s, the extension of Sembawang Airbase has acquired the portion of Lorong Gambas and Lorong Lada Merah for redevelopment works.

Organisation
Currently, there are approximately 100 helicopters based in Sembawang Air Base, almost all are operating in support of the Singapore Army and the Republic of Singapore Navy. It is the home base to all the RSAF helicopter squadrons, consisting of Eurocopter AS332 Super Pumas, Boeing CH-47SD Chinooks, Sikorsky S-70B (derivative of Sikorsky SH-60 Seahawk) naval helicopters, as well as the Eurocopter Fennecs and Bell UH-1Hs, which are currently stored in reserve. Recently added to the base are the Boeing AH-64D Longbow Apache attack helicopters.

The Flying squadrons are:
120 Squadron with 20 AH-64D Longbow Apaches;
123 Squadron with 6 S-70B Seahawks, these are owned and operated by the Republic of Singapore navy but flown by RSAF pilots;
124 Squadron with 5 EC120 Colibri, headquartered at SBAB with a training detachment at Seletar Airport;
125 Squadron with 22 AS332M Super Puma, four of these are configured for Search and rescue duties;
126 Squadron with 12 AS532UL/AL Cougar;
127 Squadron with 6 CH-47D and 12 CH-47SD Chinooks.

The Support Squadrons are:
Aircraft Operations Engineering Squadron – 806 SQN
Aircraft Specialist Engineering Squadron – 816 SQN
Airbase Sustainment Squadron – 706 SQN
Airbase Civil Engineering Squadron – 506 SQN
Force Protection Squadron – 606 SQN
Control Squadron – 206 SQN

Currently, the RSAF's Chong Pang Camp with its associated Air Defence assets, is also located within the compound of the air base as well as the famous local Sembawang Hot Spring.

Photo gallery

See also
Battle of Singapore
British Far East Command
Far East Air Force (Royal Air Force)
Far East Strategic Reserve
Indonesia–Malaysia confrontation
Former overseas RAF bases
Malayan Emergency
Republic of Singapore Air Force
Singapore strategy

References

Citations

Bibliography

External links

History of RAF
RSAF web page on Sembawang Air Base (SBAB)
Background history of R.N.A.S. Sembawang
Naval Historical Society of Australia
 Royal Navy Research Archive

 

Airports in Singapore
Camps and bases of the Singapore Armed Forces
Heliports in Singapore
Military of Singapore under British rule
Republic of Singapore Air Force bases
Sembawang
World War II sites in Singapore